The World Trophy, originally known as the Helms Award, was an annual sporting award established by the Helms Athletic Foundation in 1939 to honour the foremost amateur athlete of each continent of the world, including Africa, Asia, Australasia, Europe, North America, and South America. Even though the Foundation was established in 1936, the awards date back to the 1896, the year of the first Summer Olympics. Australasian awards for 1896 to 1949 were decided by a Committee in Australasia established by the Foundation. Members of the Committee were Sir Frank Beaurepaire (Chairman), and Messrs. Harold G. Alderson, Hugh R. Weir, Jack Metcalfe, Frank H. Pizzey, Hector de Lacy, Ern Cowley and R.J.  McPherson (Secretary).
 After the initial Committee selection, amateur athletes were nominated by their own countries for consideration by the Foundation. Winners were presented with a silver plaque and had their names added to the World Trophy that was located at the Helms Foundation and subsequently the Amateur Athletic Foundation of Los Angeles (now known as the LA84 Foundation). Winners can only win the award once.

Winners

See also
Sport Australia Hall of Fame inductees
 Sport in Australia
 Australian Sport Awards
 Australian Institute of Sport Awards
 ABC Sports Award of the Year

References

Sport in Australia
Sport in New Zealand
Australian sports trophies and awards
New Zealand sports trophies and awards